Otis is an area in the city of Cedar Rapids in Linn County, Iowa, United States.

History
The community was named for Harrison Gray Otis, a Massachusetts politician.

References

Neighborhoods in Iowa